The Islamic Center of Greater Austin or ICGA is a mosque and Islamic community center in Austin, Texas in the United States.

The Center was established in March 1977 as a non-profit religious organization registered with the State of Texas and is affiliated with the Islamic Society of North America (ISNA) and the North American Islamic Trust (NAIT), which is a subsidiary of ISNA, as its trustee. The center's property is waqf under NAIT.

Organization history
The mosque started in a  building without any parking space. It was expanded in 1982 with the purchase of an adjacent building that was remodeled into a prayer hall. In November 1999, the Center completed a two-story building which houses a mosque to accommodate around 1000 congregants and a full-time Islamic school on the second floor.

Activities
The center offers facilities for daily prayers, a full-time licensed Islamic school, an educational center, audio/video library, weekly Quran school, seminars, workshops and symposiums, counseling center for battered families, marriage contract officiation, ghusl facility and burial services with a  Muslim cemetery.

References

External links
 

Mosques in Texas
Greater Austin
1977 establishments in Texas
Mosques completed in 1999
Islamic organizations established in 1977